Rebecca Orendorz  (born 28 April 1993) is a German ice hockey player and member of the German national team, currently playing in the German Women's Ice Hockey League (DFEL) with ESC Planegg.

Active with the German national team since 2011, she participated in the IIHF Women's World Championship Top Division tournaments in 2012, 2015, 2017, 2019, and 2021.

In 2020, she married German ice hockey defenseman Dieter Orendorz.

References

External links
 

1993 births
Living people
German women's ice hockey defencemen
People from Iserlohn
Sportspeople from Arnsberg (region)